This is a list of the flora of the South Sandwich Islands, a group of islands in the subantarctic Atlantic Ocean, part of the British overseas territory of South Georgia and the South Sandwich Islands. The list contains flora in the strict sense; that is, plants only. It comprises a single species of vascular plant, 38 mosses, and 11 liverworts. Unusually, not a single species is known to have naturalised on the islands; all are presumed native.

The islands also contain 5 species of fungus, 41 lichens and 16 diatoms.

Vascular plants
 Deschampsia antarctica

Mosses
 Andreaea gainii
 Andreaea regularis
 Anisothecium hookeri
 Bartramia patens
 Bracythecium austrosalebrosum
 Bracythecium fuegianum
 Bracythecium glaciale
 Bryum argenteum
 Bryum dichotomum
 Bryum orbiculatifolium
 Bryum pseudomicron
 Bryum pseudotriquetrum
 Campylopus introflexus
 Campylopus spiralis
 Ceratodon purpureus
 Dicranella hilariana
 Dicranoweisia brevipes
 Dicranoweisia grimmiacea
 Ditrichum gemmiferum
 Ditrichum heteromallum
 Ditrichum hyalinum
 Ditrichum lewis-smithii
 Hennediella antarctica
 Kiaeria pumila
 Notoligotrichum trichodon
 Pohlia drummondii
 Pohlia nutans
 Polytrichastrum alpinum
 Polytrichum juniperinum
 Polytrichum piliferum
 Polytrichum strictum
 Racomitrium orthotrichaceum
 Racomitrium sudeticum
 Sanionia georgico-uncinata
 Sanionia uncinata
 Schizymenium austrogeorgicum
 Syntrichia filaris
 Syntrichia princeps

Liverworts
 Cephalozia badia
 Cephaloziella varians
 Clasmatocolea rigens
 Cryptochila grandiflora
 Lepidozia chordulifera
 Lophocoela lenta
 Lophozia chordulifera
 Marchantia berteroana
 Pachyglossa dissitifolia
 Riccardia georgiensis
 Triandrophyllum subtrifidum

References
 

 
Lists of plants